Between 10th and 11th is the second studio album by British rock band the Charlatans, released on 23 March 1992 through Situation Two, a subsidiary of Beggars Banquet Records. Shortly after the release of their debut studio album Some Friendly (1990), the band started writing new material. After some writing sessions in Birmingham and a tour of the United Kingdom, guitarist John Baker left the band. Mark Collins of Candlestick Park was drafted in; bassist Martin Blunt went through a series of personal issues that led to hospitalization in September 1991. Following this, they began recording their next album at Rockfield Studios in Rockfield, Monmouthshire, Wales.

Two weeks of work passed before Flood was drafted in to produce the sessions. He had the band focus on live performances in lieu of recording one instrument at a time. Between 10th and 11th is a Madchester album with lyrical themes of introspection and self-doubt, influenced by E. E. Cummings and Bob Dylan. Frontman Tim Burgess attributed some of the album's electronic textures to him spending time in New York City; some of the sparser song arrangements recalled the work of Talk Talk.

"Weirdo" was released as the lead single from the album in February 1992, which was promoted with two one-off shows in Glasgow. The Charlatans embarked on a tour of the United States in April 1992 with Catherine Wheel and the Wolfgang Press, followed by a trek across mainland Europe in the next month. They then went on a two-month US tour, which was cut short due to the birth of Blunt's child. In the middle of the tour, "Tremelo Song" was released as the album's second single in July 1992, which was promoted with an appearance at Reading Festival and a tour of Japan in September 1992.

Between 10th and 11th received unfavourable reviews from music critics, many of which criticized the band, especially Burgess, for being lazy. Negative attention was also drawn to Burgess' lyrics and the album's artwork. Retrospective reviews of the album were more favourable, with some finding it to be an underrated release. It peaked at number 21 in the UK and number 173 on the US Billboard 200. "Weirdo" charted at number 19 in the UK, number 22 in Ireland and number 67 in the Netherlands, while "Tremelo Song" charted at number 44 in the UK.

Background and Baker's departure
The Charlatans released their debut studio album Some Friendly in October 1990. The band promoted their debut with a tour of the United Kingdom and mainland Europe, with support from Intastella, until the end of the year. During this stint, the band debuted a new song, "Can't Even Be Bothered". In between shows, the band wrote a few new songs with the potential of being their next single. While demoing material, Beggars Banquet Records asked them to come up with another song like their hit single "The Only One I Know". In February 1991, the band embarked on their first tour of the United States, coinciding with the US release of "Sproston Green". The members were surprised when the song started gaining traction in the US, which concerned them that the tour would be extended and delay any further recording sessions. The Charlatans returned to the UK, marking the end of both the band and the Madchester scene trying to break the US.

Around this time, as Beggars Banquet wanted another single from the band for the UK market, the Over Rising EP was released on 25 February 1991. The EP was produced by David M. Allen and showed the band partially moving away from the baggy sound of their previous work into psychedelia. A month after the end of their US tour, they toured Australia, New Zealand and played three shows in Japan. This brief stint was a culture shock for the members, who wanted to return home as soon as possible. The band had struggled previously to write new material while on tour, which caused issues when they started writing shortly after the Japanese dates. Writing sessions were held at Rich Bitch studios in Birmingham while the band was under pressure to deliver something new. They wanted to go in a more electronic and experimental direction for their next album.

Guitarist John Baker felt insecure about the proceedings, realising what he was playing was a rehash of the songs on Some Friendly. Leading up to this point, Baker found live performances joyless; he filled downtime between tours with alcohol and drugs. In June 1991, they went on a UK tour with support from Catherine Wheel, Johnny Male, Soul Family Sensation and New Fast Automatic Daffodils; in the midst of this, Baker toyed with the idea of leaving the band. Following the end of the London date, the band met with Scott Litt, known for his work with R.E.M., with the aiming of him producing their next album. Unbeknownst to Baker, keyboardist Rob Collins told the other members that he felt Baker was holding them back. Collins and bassist Martin Blunt ultimately told Baker their desire for him to leave, which he agreed to. Baker performed his last shows with the band at the end of the month, playing at Roskilde Festival in Denmark and Belfort Festival in France.

Collins' arrival and writing
With Baker's departure, potential shows in the rest of mainland Europe were scrapped and plans to release a new album were pushed back from September 1991 to early 1992. Harrison said they wanted to find someone that would contribute to the writing more, as Baker is only credited with five of the songs on Some Friendly. He contacted Alison Martin, the band's former press agent who was now working for radio plugging company Red Alert, about the situation. She discussed this with Inspiral Carpets manager Anthony Bogianno, who suggested two people: his band's roadie Noel Gallagher, and their previous van driver Mark Collins, who was now playing for his own band Candlestick Park. Collins took to hanging around the offices of Red Alert during downtime. Martin subsequently put Collins in contact with the Charlatans, who he knew had been looking for another guitarist. While this was occurring, the band had tried out the guitarist from the Honey Turtles. Blunt liked what he heard, but upon leaving the room for a smoke, Rob Collins complained about the guitarist's height. Frontman Tim Burgess had previously seen Mark Collins with his past band, the Waltones, and decided to invite him. Collins arrived to one rehearsal and was asked on the spot.

The band had been told by some associates that they should make a bigger departure from baggy, while at the same time try not to alienate their existing fan base. Blunt felt that Collins' initial contributions to writing strayed from his vision of the band's future sound, but was in line with what the others were going for. By this point, the band had reportedly finished 18 songs for their next album, with the potential of it being a double album. Manager Steve Harrison noted that Blunt was working through personal issues around this time, such as not taking to Baker's departure easily and loathed making the song "Me. In Time", wishing they recorded "Weirdo" in its place. The others were happy to consider Collins' ideas for writing and outvoting Blunt on any objections he had. He was aware of the critical backlash against Some Friendly, which their label were asking the band to still promote. Alongside this, his relationship with his wife was deteriorating; as a result, Blunt developed paranoia and by September 1991, had collapsed and was hospitalized.

Blunt was diagnosed with clinical depression and given two weeks rest. During this time, the Madchester and baggy scenes had fallen out of popularity as Nirvana released Nevermind (1991), allowing for the success of grunge acts such as Alice in Chains, Pearl Jam and Soundgarden. The Charlatans' contemporaries faced issues of their own; the Stone Roses were embroiled in a legal battle with their label, and Happy Mondays were plagued with negative attention from press outlets. The Charlatans had a self-imposed policy about not taking more than one single from an album, which meant they used any additional songs on the Over Rising EP and the forthcoming "Me. In Time" single. They had only four pre-Collins songs, namely, "Werido", "Tremelo Song", "Can't Even Be Bothered" and "(No One) Not Even the Rain", left unrecorded.

Recording

The Charlatans travelled to Rockfield, Monmouthshire, Wales, where they went to record at Rockfield Studios. "Me. In Time" was released as a standalone stop-gap single, produced by Hugh Jones, in October 1991. The song had reached number 28 on the UK Singles Chart, which they deemed a failure as a re-release of their debut single, "Indian Rope", reached the top 60 without any promotional efforts. They had been working for two weeks at Rockfield, before they decided to bring a producer in. The band were unsure of who they wanted to work with, resulting in Beggars Banquet sending them CVs from various individuals. As they found the Rich Bitch studios sessions to be fruitless, they wanted to work with someone that could encapsulate the band's spirit. Chris Nagle, who previously produced Some Friendly, was occupied with Inspiral Carpets and thus unavailable. Flood was suggested by someone at the band's song publishers Warner Chappell Music, previously working with the likes of Nine Inch Nails and Pop Will Eat Itself. He was eventually selected after Burgess showed the rest of the band Movement (1981) by New Order and This Is the Day...This Is the Hour...This Is This! (1989) by Pop Will Eat Itself.

Flood had previously made a remix of "Sproston Green" for the US market, and a different remix for the Over Rising EP. When he was contacted by the band, Flood had finished working on Achtung Baby (1991) by U2. The members were unaware that he worked with U2, as they were more familiar with his work with Depeche Mode and the Wolfgang Press. Flood agreed to work with the band after learning that his girlfriend enjoyed Some Friendly. After arriving at Rockfield, Flood scrapped all of the material the Charlatans had done up to that point, leaving only six weeks left to record and mix an album's worth of songs. Paul Cobbold served as engineer; him and Flood were assisted by Daren Galer, Goetz Botenhart and Philip Ault. Flood's method of working saw the band do live performances together, break recording into separate portions, and then construct songs with different rhythm parts and effects, while keeping the melodies intact. Nagle, by contrast, would have the band record to a click track, doing one instrument at a time over a period of weeks. Flood preferred working hard in short bursts of productivity; at one point, the band had completed 11 backing tracks in eight days.

The members of the band were not used to this approach, feeling it took an intensive toil on them. Each of the members would argue amongst themselves, requiring Flood to break any stalemates and ensure work continued. He helped the band learn how to use studio technology, such as in "Weirdo" where he showed the band how to use sequencers in a live setting. Rob Collins had brought a sampler into the studio, which he would use to come up with parts and melody lines for "Tremelo Song", "The End of Everything" and "Weirdo". Jones is credited as original recording producer on "Subtitle", having been previously released as one of the B-sides to "Me. In Time"; Flood remixed it for inclusion on the new album. As Burgess was late with coming up with the lyrics for "(No One) Not Even the Rain", he recorded his vocals for it at Strongroom in London. He later admitted that all of them had an "ego problem", claiming that none of them wanted to be in the same room. He said collaborating with someone like Flood "really didn't work. We didn't have the songs for it, and he didn't tell us when he was supposed to be the producer". Despite this, Blunt became close with Flood and asked if he would produce their subsequent work.

Composition and lyrics

Themes and music
Discussing the overall lyrical theme, Burgess said it was "weird. It was like 'Please get me out of this place. Topics, such as introspection and self-doubting, can be found throughout the songs, taking influence from E. E. Cummings and Bob Dylan. Author Dominic Wills in The Charlatans: The Authorised History (1999) said Burgess admired Cummings' "abrasive belligerence and the abandon of his uninhibited Bohemianism". PopMatters John Bergstrom said drummer Jon Brookes toned down the "jaunty shuffle rhythm that permeated every track on the debut," in favour of a "more subtle yet evocative" playing style. Burgess felt his time spent in New York City influenced the album's song titles and electronic textures. During the making of the album, Burgess consumed the music of Dylan, being enthralled with his albums Bringing It All Back Home (1965), Highway 61 Revisited (1965) and Blonde on Blonde (1966). Despite the influx of inspiration, Burgess found songwriting during this time difficult, with Blunt criticizing Burgess' lyrics, which Burgess later attributed to his mental state.

The album's name, Between 10th and 11th, alluded to the Marquis Theatre in New York City, where the band played their first show in the US. The title had previously given to a song they performed for a John Peel session in early 1991 that was ultimately scrapped. Prefabs and Riches and Anticlockwise had been suggested as working titles, with the latter ending up on some promotional copies of the album. Burgess said it was considered "too negative"; as he was spending his downtime between East Village in New York City, Chiswick in London and his parents' home in Moulton, Northamptonshire, he felt a reference to New York with its final title would be appropriate.

Musically, the album's sound has been described as Madchester and experimental. Journalist John Robb in his biography of the Charlatans, The Charlatans: We Are Rock (1998), said "on one level there is a rasping rawness and a great drum sound, on the other some of the song arrangements sound a tad empty", bordering on the sound of Talk Talk. Wills said Flood was "true to his word in retaining the band's [...] melodic flourishes. But the beat was clearly at the front of his mind, and the industrial idiosyncrasies that had made his name" could be found, such as the sound of Collins dropping his guitar amplifier. Robb said Collins' guitarwork throughout the album sounds like him "warming up [...] His guitar, when it cuts in, is razer-sharp like taut wire. A rasping and great sound, devilish licks lash across the tracks". Though Baker claimed to have worked on three songs from the album, including "Weirdo" and "(No One) Not Even the Rain", he is not credited on any of the tracks. The other six were credited to the new line-up of Blunt–Brookes–Burgess–Mark Collins–Rob Collins. Two of these had been finished prior to Mark Collins' arrival, with him only adding supplemental guitar parts. He helped with the creation of the other four, having only been in the band for two months at that point.

Tracks
The opening track to Between 10th and 11th, "I Don't Want to See the Sights", includes brushes interacting with piano strings. This was overdubbed with the strings being picked, altered by reverse reverb. "Ignition" was originally called "Anticlockwise", referring to things out of the band's control going wrong. "Page One" was originally named "Vulture" after its opening lyric; its rhythmic sound was reminiscent of the work of New Order. For the song, Collins would layer acoustic and electric guitars and use different tunings. Burgess said it talks about "spoiling someone’s fun" as he was "very [un]happy with how trapped I felt". "Tremelo Song" mixed 1970s disco with 1990s dance, accompanied by a reoccurring piano part in the style of "We Love You" (1967) by the Rolling Stones. The song feature two different choruses as they could not decide which to use, so they used both. The first chorus is sung by Rob Collins while the other is sung by Burgess. The lyrics for these sections refer to being an independent individual, without being under the control of The Man. "The End of Everything" is a war song that Burgess based on "Love Vigilantes" (1985) by New Order; he explained that his friend faked having an illness in order to leave the army.

"Subtitle" was the result of Burgess attempting scratch vocals for an idea based on two phrases and ended up writing a fully completed song instead. The guitars recalled the work of the Who, accompanied by new-age keyboard parts. The guitarwork in "Can't Even Be Bothered", enhanced by tremolo effect, recall the ones heard in "Flying" (1967) by the Beatles. Blunt's bass part evoked "Under My Thumb" (1966) by the Rolling Stones. The chorus sections had the most similarity to the songs on Some Friendly. "Weirdo" is an introspective song; Burgess said the title phrase is used as a form of endearment, as in being proud to be an outsider. He noted that Nevermind was "quite direct" and thought if they were just as direct, the song would be "quite suitable to the [musical] surroundings". The song was originally going to start with guitar, bass and drums, until Flood added the outro Hammond section to the beginning. Discussing the title of "Chewing Gum Weekend", Blunt said there was only two reasons for chewing gum: "you're trying to pack in smoking or you're trying to stop yourself grinding your own teeth to dust". One of the lines in "(No One) Not Even the Rain" is directly taken from the final line in Cummings' poem Somewhere I Have Never Traveled. The outro portion alludes to the material on 20 Jazz Funk Greats (1979) Throbbing Gristle.

Release

"Weirdo" single and album promotion
"Weirdo" was released as the lead single from the album on 28 February 1992, with the instrumental "Theme From 'The Wish'", an alternative version of "Weirdo" and Flood's remix of "Sproston Green" as the B-sides. The song's music video, which was filmed in London, sees the band, a Dalmatian dog and a dancer sitting on a couch. The band's US label, RCA Records, flew the band to Los Angeles, California to film back-to-back videos for "I Don't Want to See the Sights" and "Weirdo" with Samuel Bayer, who had directed the video for Nirvana's "Smells Like Teen Spirit" (1991). The video for "I Don't Want to See the Sights" was shot in a mental institution, starring a man spinning in a wheelchair. The band played two shows at King Tut's Wah Wah Hut in Glasgow on 29 February and 1 March 1992 as a warm-up for Collins and to test the new songs in a live setting.

Between 10th and 11th was released on 23 March 1992 through Beggars Banquet imprint Situation Two; its artwork features a photo of bananas taken by Steve Majors. Little time had been afforded for the artwork for the artwork, with the final chosen one picked from a variety of other shots. Burgess said the bananas looked Andy Warhol-esque, though Wills said it was not an intentional homage to The Velvet Underground & Nico (1967) by the Velvet Underground. The band promoted the album with two shows in Greece, prior to a tour of the UK with support from the Milltown Brothers. Two Hammond organs belong to Rob Collins had broken during the tour, and a fight broke out after one of the shows, resulting in him leaving the venue and threatening to quit the band. With the album's sales teetering out, Beggars Banquet wanted another single from the album, which annoyed the band. They also asked if the band could embrace formatting, meaning releasing singles with multiple sleeves and different accompanying songs. The band saw this as a form of exploiting their fans, and going against their working-class principals.

US tours, "Tremelo Song" single and later promotion
By this point, Some Friendly had sold 350,000 copies in the US and the band were figuring out the best way to promote the new album there. They thought with the right amount of exposure, they could do their own headlining tour in that market, an idea that Beggars Banquet resisted.  It was proposed by the president of RCA Records that they could do a co-headlining tour there with Peter Murphy for six weeks, allowing them to play 5,000-capacity venues instead of 2,000-capacity locations. Harrison said Murphy's a "goth and fucking crap" and the rest of the band were uncomfortable with the suggestion. This answer annoyed RCA Records, who wanted to plan everything out in the advance, unlike the band and Harrison, who preferred perseverance. In the past, Beggars Banquet would help to smooth over situations like this, but RCA stopped returning the band's calls and redirected them to different offices in the company.

The band eventually embarked on a US tour in April 1992, starting with an appearance at Edgefest in Dallas, Texas. They were supported by Catherine Wheel and the Wolfgang Press. While some of the shows were bigger than their previous US tour, reception to the album seem muted. Upon returning to the UK, they noticed that even though album sales were down, their live crowds were growing in size. Following this, they embarked on a month-long trek trough mainland Europe in May 1992. From June 1992, the band went on what was to be an expansive tour of the US. However, following the birth of Blunt's child and a negative back-stage interaction with Madonna, the band opted to return home early in August 1992. Mark Collins said they had to pick between "another 20,000 sales or keeping your sanity. We chose sanity".

In the midst of this, Beggars Banquet felt another single was essential and planned out different formatting options, much to the anger of the band. Due to the constant touring, they had little to offer their fans in terms of new B-sides. "Tremelo Song" was selected as the single, released on 6 July 1992, and was accompanied by "Happen to Die", a demo titled "Normality Swing" and live versions of "Then" and "Chewing Gum Weekend" as the B-sides. The music video for "Tremelo Song" has an arthouse aesthetic; it features Spencer Leigh walking into the sea, before it cuts to him entering a pub, where he finds the band drinking. Burgess said they tried to "make sure it was always something new, not just dodgy live versions". Harrison, meanwhile, was more sympathetic to the label: "Eventually, though, you do have to consider the record company's needs, and one of their main needs is to compete in the market-place". Later in August 1992, the band sub-headlined Reading Festival and went on a short tour of Japan the following month.

Reissues and related releases
In 2008, Beggars Banquet Records had wanted to do expansive box sets for Some Friendly and Between 10th and 11th, but plans stalled with the band's management. It was subsequently reissued as a two-CD set in 2020, packaged with the live album Isolation 21.2.91 Live at Chicago Metro, which was originally released in 1991, though lacked any contemporary B-sides or alternative mixes. The Reading Festival appearance was released as the live album Live at Reading Festival :: 1992 in 2022.

"Weirdo" was included on the band's first, third and fifth compilation albums, Melting Pot (1998), Forever: The Singles (2006) and A Head Full of Ideas (2021), respectively. As part of the 2019 Record Store Day event, "Weirdo" and "Tremelo Song" were released as part of the seven-inch vinyl box set Everything Changed (2019).

Reception

Contemporary reviews
Wills said the music critics lambasted Between 10th and 11th upon its release, receiving an appraisal in the ensuring years. Many reviewers felt that the Charlatans had employed Flood in the same manner that U2 did: "to make themselves look like avant garde risk takers, and to disguise the fact that they had come up with no melodies". Flood avoided disdain while the band were criticized, especially Burgess, for being lazy. His lyrics were also berated, as was the album's cover artwork.

Melody Maker writer Steve Sutherland was dismayed with the album for being too "ill-focused and lacking in any sort of energy", and balking Burgess' lyrical writing for being "freely associative bilge". Pittsburgh Post-Gazette writer Scott Mervis said the album showed that the band could "stretch out" their sound, but told the listeners not to focus on the lyrics. Select writer Adam Higginbotham felt the album continued the issues that the last one had: "[Burgess] was making everything up as he went along, murmuring away over a groovy backdrop in the hope of stubmling across a vocal line". Bill Wyman of Entertainment Weekly similarly dismissed the lyrics as "blather", but complimented the band's "swirling rhythms and distinctive instrumentation".

The Blade Doug Iverson noted that the band offered "a bit more of a growl" with the new album, giving "more intriguing results" than the previous album. The staff at NME said that while it may not be "stuffed with great singles", it showed a band "strech[ing] out and mak[ing] some great interesting music", which was something that should be praised "in the gaping post-baggy vacuum". Mark Caro of Chicago Tribune noted that Collins' guitar parts were "pushed to the forefront and the density and urgency somewhat dissipated" as a result. Rolling Stone reviewer Rob O'Connor said the album "works on a subtler level" as the "mix is more densely layered". Higginbotham said that "[d]espite a new sound" and Flood's production, the "fundamental problem lingers".

Retrospective reviews and commercial performance

John Harris saw it as a "very underrated album", though slighted the "pretty crap" packaging and artwork choice, negatively comparing it to Northside. Wills called it an "intriguing collection, disappointing in its lack of cheap thrills but impressive, especially rhythmically, in its struggle to rise above the norm". Robb felt that they were trying "too hard to break away from their pop roots and prove themselves as a band with 'depth. Punk Planet writer Julie Gerstein felt the album was "by and large overlooked" upon its release due to the changing musical landscape. She referred to the face the Charlatans made an album as "lush" as this one "without the use of samplers is remarkable and makes them something of an anomaly of the period". AllMusic reviewer Ned Raggett found it to be "much stronger than its reputation" precedes it, saying that Flood's production was "strengthening and creating excellent arrangements for everyone as a whole".

Bergstrom found it to be a "surprisingly calm, introspective, almost mournful album", even though what the band were mourning seemed to be vague. He called it a "quantum leap in musical maturity and sophistication" from their debut, and highlighted Flood's "crisp, clean sound". The staff at The New Rolling Stone Album Guide felt that even though it lacked any memorable moments and did not have a "hook in sight," it was far superior to Some Friendly. Describing the album in 2021, Burgess it was "pretty extreme for some people. We completely dismantled everything that we had, we changed a band member, and Rob felt that he’d done everything, really, on the first album". Ian King of Under the Radar added to this, saying Flood's production was a "significant part of what distinguishes this record in The Charlatans’ discography". When reviewing the 2020 reissue, Bergstrom thought the inclusion of the live show added "no historical context" as it contained zero songs from Between 10th and 11th.

Though Between 10th and 11th entered the midweek chart at number four, it eventually landed at number 21 on the UK Albums Chart. Robb suggested that the lack of commercial success was likely down to the general public a "backlash amongst record buyers who were growing tired of what they perceived as the Manchester [and baggy] thing than the band not delivering" something of quality. A week after the final date of their April 1992 US tour, the album peaked at number 173 on the Billboard 200, while in the Netherlands it reached number 73. By February 1994, the album had sold 92,000 copies in the US. "Weirdo" charted at number 19 in the UK, number 22 in Ireland and number 67 in the Netherlands. "Tremelo Song" charted at number 44 in the UK.

Track listing
All songs written by Martin Blunt, Jon Brookes, Tim Burgess, Mark Collins and Rob Collins, except where noted.

Personnel
Personnel per booklet.

The Charlatans
 Martin Blunt – bass
 Jon Brookes – drums
 Tim Burgess – vocals
 Mark Collins – guitar
 Rob Collins – keyboards

Production and design
 Flood – producer, mixing
 Paul Cobbold – engineer
 Darren Galer – assistant
 Goetz Botenhardt – assistant
 Philip Ault – assistant
 Hugh Jones – original recording producer (track 6)
 Kim Peters – art direction
 Steve Majors – front cover photography
 Steve Double – group photography

Charts

See also
 Yes Please!

References
Citations

Sources

External links

Between 10th and 11th at YouTube (streamed copy where licensed)

The Charlatans (English band) albums
1992 albums
Albums produced by Flood (producer)
Situation Two albums